Guardian Angel Cathedral is a Catholic cathedral in Winchester, Nevada, United States, in the Las Vegas Valley. It is just off the Las Vegas Strip, north of the Encore hotel. Since the creation of the Diocese of Las Vegas in 1995, Guardian Angel has been the seat of the bishop, previously having been a parish of the Diocese of Reno.

History
St. Viator Church was built on the site of the former city dump in 1955.  The ground proved to be unstable and the church was condemned and torn down six months after it opened.  The Rev. Richard Crowley, CSV, now churchless, approached Moe Dalitz to donate land on the Las Vegas Strip.  Although Jewish, Dalitz liked the idea of having a church convenient for his casino workers.  He donated land near the Desert Inn in 1961.  Dalitz was familiar with the work of Los Angeles architect Paul R. Williams and approached him to design the new church.  Guardian Angel Shrine was opened on October 2, 1963.  In 1977 Bishop Norman McFarland of the recently re-designated Diocese of Reno-Las Vegas chose the shrine as the co-cathedral.  The diocese was divided in 1995 and the Diocese of Las Vegas was established.  Guardian Angel retained its status as a cathedral.  The cathedral was renovated for $1.3 million in 1995.

Architecture
Architect Paul R. Williams used an A-frame design for the church structure.  A four-sided spire capped with a cross is located to the front left of the cathedral.  At its base is a statue of the Holy Family. There is a large mosaic over the main entrance of the cathedral  by Los Angeles artist Edith Piczek.  It represents the Guardian Angel with three figures: Penance, Prayer and Peace.  She also created the mural on the rear chancel wall, which is titled The Final Beginning.  The stained glass windows, which depict the Stations of the Cross, are by her sister Isabel Piczek. They are located in 12 triangular niches that bisect the A-frame.   A large crucifix is suspended from the ceiling above the altar and in front of the chancel mural.  There is seating for 1,100 people in the cathedral.  The pews on the main floor are divided into four sections across the nave, and a deep gallery above the main entrance.  The Blessed Sacrament is housed in a chapel to the right of the altar, and the Lady chapel is located on the opposite side of the cathedral.

See also
 List of churches in the Roman Catholic Diocese of Las Vegas

References

External links

Official Cathedral Site
Diocese of Las Vegas Official Site

Cathedrals in Nevada
Roman Catholic cathedrals in Nevada
Roman Catholic churches in Nevada
Buildings and structures in Winchester, Nevada
Roman Catholic Diocese of Las Vegas
Christian organizations established in 1963
Roman Catholic churches completed in 1963
Modernist architecture in Nevada
Paul Williams (architect) buildings
20th-century Roman Catholic church buildings in the United States